Shafiq Mill Colony is a neighbourhood in the Karachi Central district of Karachi, Pakistan.

There are several ethnic groups in Shafiq Mill Colony including Muhajirs, Sindhis, Kashmiris, Seraikis, Pakhtuns, Balochis, Memons, Bohras, Ismailis, etc.

References

External links 
 Karachi Website.
 Gulberg Town.

Neighbourhoods of Karachi
Gulberg Town, Karachi